Mahmud Mahmud (1881–1965) was an Iranian politician and historian. He served as Governor of Tehran, Member of Parliament, and Minister of Post and Telegraph.

He also was active academically. He wrote many articles and books, and also translated Machiavelli's "Principe" into Persian. His most extensive work was a volume series titled The Political Relations of Iran and Britain in the 19th Century.

He died a blind man at the age of 84 in Tehran.

See also
Pahlavi Dynasty
List of prime ministers of Iran

References used
The following reference was used for the above writing: 'Alí Rizā Awsatí. (2003). Iran in the Past Three Centuries (Irān dar Se Qarn-e Goz̲ashteh, Volumes 1 and 2 (Paktāb Publishing, Tehran).  (Vol. 1),  (Vol. 2).

References

1881 births
1965 deaths
Blind academics
Governors of Tehran Province
Members of the National Consultative Assembly
Government ministers of Iran
Politicians from Tabriz
Democrat Party of Iran politicians
Democrat Party (Persia) politicians
Socialist Party (Iran) politicians